Mayblossom is an extant  1917 silent feature film directed by Edward José and starring Pearl White.

Cast
Pearl White - Annabel
Hal Forde - Warner Richmond
Fuller Mellish - Warner's grandfather

References

External links

1917 films
American silent feature films
Films directed by Edward José
1917 romantic drama films
American romantic drama films
American black-and-white films
1910s American films
Silent romantic drama films
Silent American drama films